Waterford Schools may refer to:
 Waterford School District in Michigan
 Waterford Township School District in New Jersey